Danio quagga  is a species of Danio found in the Chindwin River drainage in western Myanmar.

References

Danio
Cyprinid fish of Asia
Fish described in 2009